State Road 42 (NM 42) is a state highway in the US state of New Mexico. NM 42's southern terminus is in the village of Corona, at U.S. Route 54 (US 54) and NM 42's northern terminus is in the village of Willard, at US 60.

Major intersections

See also

References

042
Transportation in Torrance County, New Mexico